During World War II, some Belarusians collaborated with the invading Axis powers. Until the beginning of Operation Barbarossa in 1941, the territory of Belarus was under control of the Soviet Union, as the Byelorussian Soviet Socialist Republic. However, memories of the Soviet repressions in Belarus and collectivization, as well as of the polonization and discrimination of Belarusians in the Second Polish Republic were still fresh, and many people in Belarus wanted an independent nation. Many Belarusians chose to cooperate with the invaders in order to achieve that goal, assuming that Nazi Germany might allow them to have their own independent state after the war ended. 

The Belarusian organizations never received any administrative control over the territory of Belarus. The real power was held by the German civil and military administrations. The collaborationist Belarusian Central Rada, presenting itself as a Belarusian governmental body, was formed in Minsk a few months before Belarus was retaken by the Soviet Army.

The group was far less influential than other Belarusian political parties in interwar Poland, such as the Belarusian Peasants' and Workers' Union and the Belarusian Christian Democracy. BNSP was banned by the Polish authorities in 1937. Its leaders left for Berlin and became one of the first advisers to the Germans at the onset of Operation Barbarossa.

Administration 
Reichskommissariat Ostland
Belarusian Central Council
Zuyev Republic

Belarusian military and paramilitary units in the German army 

Belarusian Abwehr/Brandenburg Sabouteur agents
Vorkommando Einsatzgruppe B, also Vorkommando Moskau 
Byelorussian Auxiliary Police
Byelorussian Home Defence (Belarusian Interior Guard – BKA)
29. Waffen-Grenadier-Division der SS RONA (russische Nr. 1)
30. Waffen-Grenadier-Division der SS (weißruthenische Nr. 1)
weissruthenische Waffen-Grenadier-Regiment der SS 75
I./weissruthenische Waffen-Grenadier-Regiment der SS 75
II./weissruthenische Waffen-Grenadier-Regiment der SS 75
III./weissruthenische Waffen-Grenadier-Regiment der SS 75
13th weissruthenische battalion of SD
weissruthenische Artillerie-Abteilung
weissruthenische Panzerjäger-Abteilung
weissruthenische Reiter-Schwadron
Waffen Sturmbrigade Belarus
"Čorny Kot" ("Black Cat") Special undercover unit

German Commanders and officers associated with Belarus
SS Officer Dr. Franz Six
General Reinhard Gehlen, Chief of German East-Front Intelligence with offices in Smolensk
Generalkommissar Wilhelm Kube
SS General Kurt von Gottberg
SS Colonel Otto Skorzeny
SS-Standartenführer Hans Siegling

Political leaders
Radasłaŭ Astroŭski - Mayor of Smolensk and later the President of Belarusian Central Rada
Jury Sabaleŭski - Major of Baranavičy and Vice-President of the Belarusian Central Council
Mikałaj Łapicki - Orthodox priest and Editor-in-Chief of the Ranica newspaper
Vacłaŭ Ivanoŭski - Mayor of Minsk
Ivan Yermachenka - local political adviser
Stanisłaŭ Stankievič - Mayor of Barysaŭ
Emmanuel Jasiuk - Mayor of Klecak
Jaŭchim Kipel - president of the Second All-Belarusian Rada Congress
Ivan Kasiak - Belarusian provincial governor
Jury Bartyševič - Minister of Administration of occupational Astroŭski government
Anton Adamovič - member in self-help Belarusian organization
Mikola Abramchyk - editor of the Ranica newspaper
Stanisłaŭ Hrynkievič
Piotra Orsa - Minister of Economics and Agriculture

Military commanders

Źmicier Kasmovič, the police chief of Smolensk
Francišak Kušal, Commander of local BKA police forces
Michał Vituška, Commander of "Black Cat" special unit
Colonel Alexander Buglaj

Political organizations
 Belarusian Independence Party
 Belarusian National Socialist Party
 Self-help Belarusian Groups
 Belarusian affairs office
 Belarusian "Ventruensausschuss" administrative-political organization
 First Zentralrat political organization

Media
Ranica, a Berlin-based Belarusian newspaper
Belaruskaya Gazeta

See also
 Belarusian resistance during World War II
 Occupation of Belarus by Nazi Germany
 Collaboration with the Axis Powers during World War II

Notes

References